Ada is a city in and the county seat of Pontotoc County, Oklahoma, United States. The population was 16,481 at the 2020 United States Census. The city was named for Ada Reed, the daughter of an early settler, and was incorporated in 1901. Ada is home to East Central University, and is the headquarters of the Chickasaw Nation. Ada is an Oklahoma Main Street City, an Oklahoma Certified City, and a Tree City USA member.

History

In the late 1880s, the Daggs family (by way of Texas) became the first white family to settle what is now known as Ada, which was formerly known as Daggs Prairie. In April 1889, Jeff Reed (a Texan and relative of the Daggs family) was appointed to carry the mail from Stonewall to Center (which was later combined with Pickett), two small communities in then Indian Territory. With his family and his stock, he sought a place for a home on a prairie midway between the two points, where he constructed a log house and started Reed's Store. Other settlers soon built homes nearby. In 1891, a post office was established and named after Reed's oldest daughter, Ada. Ada incorporated as a city in 1901 and grew rapidly with the arrival of the St. Louis and San Francisco Railway line. Within a decade the Santa Fe Railroad and the Oklahoma Central Railway also served the town.

Ada was originally a sundown town, where African Americans were not allowed to live. In the 1900s, the town was opened up to African Americans so that black witnesses could stay while testifying in district court. Despite a violent episode in 1904, the town remained open to African Americans to provide labor for a local cotton compress.

In 1909, the women of Ada organized an effort to build a normal school in their city. It resulted in the founding of East Central College (now East Central University).

On April 19, 1909, an organized mob hanged four men, among whom was American outlaw Deacon Jim Miller, who was set to be tried for the murder of a former U.S. marshal and member of the local freemason lodge. The town had a population of about 5,000 at the time, and 38 murders a year at the time of the lynching. The Daily Ardmoreite reported that the four lynched men were "one of the bloodiest band of murderers in the state of Oklahoma and an organization of professional assassins, that for a record of blood crimes, probably has no equal in the annals of criminal history in the entire southwest".

The first manufacturing company in Ada, the Portland Cement Company, installed the first cement clinker in Oklahoma in 1910. American Glass Casket Company began manufacturing glass caskets in 1916, but the business failed. Hazel Atlas Glass bought the plant in 1928 and produced glass products until 1991.

National Register of Historic Places
The following sites in Ada are listed on the National Register of Historic Places listings in Pontotoc County, Oklahoma:

 Ada Public Library
 Bebee Field Round House
 East Central State Normal School
 F.W. Meaders House
 Mijo Camp Industrial District
 Pontotoc County Courthouse
 Sugg Clinic
 Wintersmith Park Historic District

Culture
 

 McSwain Theatre, opened in 1920

Geography
Ada is located in the rolling hills of southeastern Oklahoma.

Climate

Demographics

2020 census

As of the 2020 United States Census, there were 16,481 people, 6,611 households, and 3,552 families residing in the city.

2010 census
As of the 2010 census, Ada's 16,810 residents consisted of 6,697 households and 3,803 families. The population density was 999.3 people per square mile (385.9/km).  The 7,862 housing units were dispersed at an average density of 475.9 per square mile (183.8/km). Ada's 2006 racial makeup was 73.81% White, 3.54% African American, 15.10% Native American, 0.83% Asian, 0.01% Pacific Islander, 0.89% from other races, and 5.81% from two or more races. Hispanics or Latinos of any race were 2.89% of the population.

Of Ada's 6,697 households, 25.9% had children under the age of 18 living with them, 40.6% were married couples living together, 12.6% had a female householder with no husband present, and 43.2% were non-families. The 15.8% of those 65 years or older living alone made up a substantial portion of the 37.1% single-person households. Average household size was 2.20 persons; average family size was 2.91.

The age breakdown in 2006 was 22.3% under the age of 18, 17.5% from 18 to 24, 24.4% from 25 to 44, 18.9% from 45 to 64, and 17.0% aged 65 or older. The median age was 33 years. For every 100 females aged 18 or over, there were 84.5 males, while for all ages, there were 100 females for every 88.4 males.

Median household income was $22,977, while median family income was $31,805. Males had a median income of $25,223 versus $17,688 for females. Ada's per capita income was $14,666. Some 14.8% of families and 21.4% of the population were below the poverty line, including 27.8% of those under 18 and 11.4% of those 65 or over.

An estimated 2,000-3,000 residents speak the Chickasaw language.

Economy
The economy of Ada is diversified. In the mid and late 20th century, the town was a manufacturing center, producing products such as Wrangler jeans, auto parts, cement and concrete, plasticware, and other products. Since the start of the 21st century, manufacturers have made major investments in expansions and new technology.

In 1975, the Chickasaw Nation opened its headquarters in Ada.  Revenues for the Nation were over 12 billion dollars in 2011, most of which is funneled through Ada. The Robert S. Kerr Environmental Research Center, a large water research lab staffed by the Environmental Protection Agency, opened in 1966. LegalShield, a multi-level marketing provider of pre-paid legal services, is headquartered in the city. Oil and natural gas remain a part of the regional economy.

The largest employers in the region are:

Ada City Schools
Chickasaw Nation
East Central University
iQor (call center for Sprint)
Pontotoc County Technology Center
Dart Container (formerly Solo Cup)
Flex-N-Gate (auto parts manufacturer)
Holcim Inc. (Portland cement)
LegalShield
Power Lift Foundation Repair
State of Oklahoma
Walmart
Kerr Lab
Mercy Hospital Ada
City of Ada

Education

Higher education
East Central University, located in Ada, is a public four-year institution that has been in operation since 1909. ECU serves roughly 4,500 students is known internationally for its cartography program, as only a few such programs exist.
ECU is also home to an Environmental Health Science Program, one of only 30 programs nationally accredited by the National Environmental Health Science and Protection Accreditation Council (EHAC).

Primary and secondary

Ada Public Schools has six primary and secondary schools.
 Glenwood Early Childhood Center
 Hayes Grade Center
 Washington Grade Center
 Willard Grade Center
 Ada Junior High School
 Ada High School

Latta Public Schools has one high school in Ada: Latta High School

Technical school
Pontotoc Technology Center (formerly Pontotoc Area Vo-Tech) is located in Ada.

Infrastructure

Highways
Major highways are:
 Oklahoma State Highway 3
 U.S. Route 377

Rail
Rail Freight is serviced by BNSF and a Union Pacific shoreline.

Air
The Ada Regional Airport (FAA Identifier: ADH), owned and operated by the City of Ada, is located two miles north of downtown, and is home to two major aeronautical industries—General Aviation Modifications, Inc. and Tornado Alley Turbo.  From the early 1950s well into the 1960s, the airport was served by Central Airlines.

Notable people

 Bill Anoatubby – Governor of the Chickasaw Nation since 1987
 Vaughn Ary – Staff Judge Advocate to the Commandant of the United States Marine Corps
 Nick Blackburn – former Minnesota Twins starting pitcher
 Harry Brecheen – former Major League Baseball All Star pitcher; graduated from Ada High School; buried at Ada's Rosedale Cemetery
 Orel Busby, attorney, lived in Ada from 1912 until appointed Associate Justice of Oklahoma Supreme Court; returned to Ada after retiring from the court in 1937
 Jeff Carpenter, musician and songwriter with the all Native American orchestral rock band Injunuity
 Dan Cody – Baltimore Ravens linebacker; born in Ada
 Johnson T. Crawford – Nuremberg trial judge
 John Daversa – Grammy Award-winning jazz trumpeter, composer/arranger, bandleader, and educator
 Denver Davison – attorney, lived in Ada from 1927 until appointed Associate Justice of Oklahoma Supreme Court in 1937; returned to Ada after retiring from the court in 1958
 Taylor "Tae" Dye – member of country duo Maddie and Tae
 Douglas Edwards – first television network anchor 
 Josh Fields – former Major League Baseball infielder; born in Ada
 Mark Gastineau – National Football League star, ECU graduate
 Monte Hale – Western-genre film star; born in Ada
 Johny Hendricks – UFC Welterweight Champion
 Anthony Armstrong Jones – country music singer
 David West Keirsey (1921–2013) – psychologist, developed the Keirsey Temperament Sorter; born in Ada
 Robert S. Kerr – former Oklahoma Governor and long-time U.S. Senator; born in Ada
 Don Owen – Louisiana news anchor and politician, worked in radio in Ada early in his career 
 Louise S. Robbins – Wisconsin Librarian of the Year (2001); named one of Oklahoma's 100 Library Legends; director of the School of Library and Information Studies at University of Wisconsin–Madison; author of two award-winning books; longtime resident of Ada and first woman city council member and mayor
 Oral Roberts – evangelist, founder of Oral Roberts University; born near Ada.
 Blaine Saunders – actress, The Middle
 Blake Shelton – country music singer with multiple No. 1 hit songs, coach on The Voice
 Jeremy Shockey – former NFL tight end; born and grew up in Ada
 Leon Polk Smith – abstract artist known for his work with geometric painting; graduate of East Central University
Jerry Walker – major league pitcher and front office executive
 Ron Williamson – minor league baseball player wrongly convicted and sentenced to death in 1988 in Ada for rape and murder but eventually exonerated. Subject of The Innocent Man by John Grisham.

In popular culture
Because of its short, palindromic spelling with frequently used letters, Ada is a very common crossword puzzle answer. Associated clues often include "Oklahoma city", "Oklahoma palindrome", and "Sooner State city."

Controversies
In 1987, journalist Robert Mayer published The Dreams of Ada exploring major flaws, irregularities, forced confessions, and possible miscarriages of justice in Ada in the convictions of Tommy Ward and Karl Fontenot for the rape and murder of Denice Haraway, who died in 1984.

In 2006, John Grisham brought Ada into the national spotlight in his nonfiction work, The Innocent Man, relating a similar story in the convictions of Ron Williamson and Dennis Fritz for the murder of Debra Sue Carter. After twelve years on death row, DNA evidence proved the men's innocence and established the guilt of the prosecution's main witness. Similar problems surrounded the trials of the two men convicted for the murder of Denice Haraway. Prosecutor Bill Peterson has self-published his disagreements with Grisham's version of events.

In 2018, Grisham's book was adapted into a Netflix series, also named The Innocent Man, combining and extending the cases outlined in his and Mayer's books.

References

External links

 City website
 Ada Jobs Foundation website
 Community website
 Ada photos on Flickr (unofficial)
 Oklahoma Main Street Community program
http://www.adachamber.com/ 
 Encyclopedia of Oklahoma History and Culture - Ada

 
Cities in Pontotoc County, Oklahoma
Cities in Oklahoma
County seats in Oklahoma
Micropolitan areas of Oklahoma
Seats of government of American Indian reservations
1891 establishments in Oklahoma Territory
Sundown towns in Oklahoma